Eimear Brannigan is a camogie player. She won All-Ireland Junior titles with Dublin in 2005 and 2006 captaining the side in 2005.  She won an All Star award in 2007 and has a senior interprovincial honour with Leinster. She holds 10 Dublin Senior League titles with her club St Vincents, as well as 5 Championship medals and 1 Leinster Club title.  She works as a Project Manager with Siemens Healthcare and is a regular contributor to RTÉ's The Sunday Game.

References

1980 births
Living people
Dublin camogie players
Sportspeople from Dublin (city)